Sir Ludovic Charles Porter  (1869–1928) was a senior British administrator in India.

Life 
He was the second son of Ludovic Porter (1836-1904), owner of sugar plantations in British Guiana, and his wife Maria (1835-1901), youngest daughter of the Reverend George Hole (1798-1859), rector of Chulmleigh, and his wife Jane (1800-1864), daughter of Robert Hawgood Crew.

After attending university he entered the Indian Civil Service, becoming in 1890 Secretary of the Education Department of the Government of India. From 1911 to 1915 he was a Member of the Council of the Governor-General of India and from 1920 a Member of Council for the United Provinces. In 1922 he was Acting Governor of the United Provinces.

Honours
In addition to being made a Companion of the Order of the Star of India in the 1916 New Year Honours and an Officer of the Order of the British Empire in the 1920 New Year Honours, he was awarded two knighthoods, first in the  1921 New Year Honours as a Knight Commander of the Order of the Indian Empire and secondly in the 1923 New Year Honours as a Knight Commander of the Order of the Star of India.

Legacy
He died unmarried and his will was proved in London on 18 April 1928 by his nephew Ludovic Ernest Porter, effects being 415 pounds (worth about 22,000 pounds in 2014). Portraits of him are in the National Portrait Gallery and some of his correspondence is held at King's College, Cambridge.

References

1869 births
1928 deaths
Knights Commander of the Order of the Indian Empire
Knights Commander of the Order of the Star of India
Officers of the Order of the British Empire
Indian Civil Service (British India) officers